Antoni Comín, born in Barcelona on March 7 1971, is a Catalan intellectual and politician from Spain. He is currently the executive vice-president of the Council for the Republic and has been an MEP since July 2019. He is the fourth child of the politician and intellectual Alfonso Carlos Comín i Ros and Maria Lluïsa Oliveres i Sanvicens, whose other children are Maria, Pere and Betona. He is the partner of the stage designer Sergi Corbera, and they have a daughter called Laia. 

He completed his primary, secondary and baccalaureate education at the Santa Ana school in Barcelona and he also studied music, specialising in piano, up to advanced level at the School of Music of Barcelona. He graduated in arts and politics from the Autonomous University of Barcelona in 1996 and was awarded a Robert Schumann Traineeship for work placement at the European Parliament headquarters in Luxembourg. He went on to study his postgraduate in Humanities at the Universitat Pompeu Fabra, where he postgraduated. 

He embarked upon his professional teaching career at the Sacred Heart School in Barcelona, and between 1998 and 2017 he lectured in the Social Philosophy Department of Esade (Universitat Ramon Llull).

Life and career 
Comín's family has been involved in politics since the 19th century. His father, Alfonso Carlos Comín, was a member of Communist PSUC. However, his grandfather, Jesús Comín Sagüés, was a Carlist MP during the Second Spanish Republic and contributed to the victory of Francisco Franco in the Spanish Civil War. The ancestors of Jesús Comín had also been prominent figures in the Carlist movement. Comín has a degree in philosophy and political sciences from the Autonomous University of Barcelona, is a professor of social sciences at ESADE (University Ramon Llull), and member of the Foundation Alfonso Comín and of the Center for the Study of Christianity & Justice. He writes periodically for The Ciervo magazine, for El Mundo and participates in the morning radio talk-show program on RAC 1 "El perquè de tot plegat".

Entering politics 
Antoni Comín i Oliveres is a member of the Fundació Alfonso Comín. The figure of Alfonso Comín, one of the most esteemed and charismatic leaders of the democratic opposition to Franco’s dictatorship, is essential to understanding the intellectual and political career of his son, Antoni Comín. Alfonso Comín represented the Christian left wing during the fight against Franco’s dictatorship and in the early years of the transition in Spain. Alfonso Comín was a staunch defender of the values of equality, social justice and Catalan nationalism, and also harboured deep Christian convictions. He was also one of the most influential figures in the political thought of Antoni Comín.

Although his political concerns come from many years back – always in the orbit of left-wing and pro-Catalan political forces – Antoni´s most active militancy period began through his participation in the Alter-globalization movement born of the World Social Forum. 

Between 2003 and 2011, he was part of the progressive, Republican and federal political movement spearheaded by Pasqual Maragall, Ciutadans pel Canvi [Citizens for Change], which brought together sectors of the pro-Catalan left wing, beyond any political affiliation, and which also ran for the elections to the Parliament of Catalonia in coalition with the Partit dels Socialistes [Socialist Party of Catalonia] (PSC).

Member of the Parliament of Catalonia 
Toni Comín was elected to the Catalan Parliament in the 2003 elections as part of the Ciutadans pel Canvi-PSC candidacy. In the course of this first period of office as an MP, he was the secretary of the Institutional Affairs Commission, in which he played a prominent role in the drafting of the new Statute of Autonomy of Catalonia, which was ratified in the 2006 Referendum. He was also actively involved in the policies implemented to promote the social economy and cooperativism of the Government of Catalonia, and also chaired the Interdepartmental Commission tasked with designing and managing the Renda Mínima d’Inserció [Minimum Integration Income].

He was re-elected MP in the 2006 elections and was appointed president of the Petitions Commission, spokesperson for the Cooperation and Solidarity Commission and Assistant Spokesperson on the Economy Commission, which dealt with fiscal matters. In the course of this mandate, he participated actively in the reform of the Inheritance Tax. 

That same year, he took charge of the political coordination of Ciutadans pel Canvi, eventually leading the Popular Legislative Initiative for a new Election Law of Catalonia, the “Via Federal” campaign, which tabled, for the first time ever in the domain of pro-Catalan socialism, the need for a constitutional reform acknowledging Catalonia's right to self-determination. He was also involved in the campaign in favour of the Minimum Integration Income.

In the course of that period, Antoni Comín was appointed vice-president of the Fundació Catalunya Segle XXI, where he coordinated the “Consulta per la Justícia Global” [Consultation for Global Justice] project that emerged from the “How to make globalisation fair” dialogue at the Universal Forum of Cultures of Barcelona in 2004. This project would subsequently give rise to the exhibition entitled: “Canvi de rumb. 9 condicions per a un món sense pobresa” [A change of direction. 9 conditions for a poverty-free world], which he curated and which was held in the Castle of Montjuïc, in 2010; in the Modernist Area of Sant Pau in 2011-2012 and in the Centre Cultural Fundació Caixa de Terrassa in 2013.

During that period, he also coordinated and promoted the Seminar on “Economic Democracy” sponsored by the Federació de Cooperatives de Treball de Catalunya.

Evolution towards pro-independence 
Following the ruling of the Constitutional Court of 2010 on the Statute of Catalonia and its political consequences, in December 2013, he and other members of the Socialist Party who were critical of the Party’s departure from its pro-Catalan tradition created a new movement Socialisme, Catalunya i Llibertat [Socialism, Catalonia and Freedom]. As of that moment he became increasingly closer to the pro-independence movement and to ERC, which took material form in 2015 when he entered the electoral lists of the pro-Independence candidacy of Junts pel Sí [Together for Yes] for the elections to the Parliament of Catalonia through ERC.

Minister of the Government of Catalonia 
On 13 January 2016, the president elect of the Government of Catalonia, Carles Puigdemont, appointed him Minister of Health of the Government of Catalonia. At the Department of Health, his priorities were:

 to reverse the budget cutbacks implemented in the health system during the Great Recession, 
 reduce the waiting lists for surgery and visits to specialists, 
 improve the casualties and emergency care system, 
 promote mental health care policies based on a community paradigm, 
 back out of the agreements reached with profit-based private hospitals, 
 promote structural and continual reform in Primary Care, 
 place the fight against inequality in health at the centre of all policies, 
 bolster the Public Health System and promote the health strategy in all policies, 
 foster job stability for healthcare professionals, 
 recover the healthcare infrastructure investment policy (with particular emphasis on the comprehensive renewal of Catalonia’s two largest hospitals, the Vall d’Hebron and the Hospital Clínic), 
 and transform the prevailing healthcare model to include specific groups (transsexuals, fibromyalgia patients, in vitro fertilisation for lesbians, etc.), among others.

October 1 2017 Referendum 
The Catalan independence referendum was held on 1 October 2017. Like the other members of the government, he was removed from his position of Autonomous Minister of Health from the Government of Catalonia by the Spanish Government through the enforcement of article 155 of the Spanish Constitution of 27 October 2017. On 30 October, he was forced into exile to Brussels, together with president Carles Puigdemont and another three members of the government, Clara Ponsatí, Lluís Puig and Meritxell Serret.

Exile 
Antoni Comín i Oliveres and other members of the Catalan government remained in the capital of Europe to continue the "fight against Spanish repression from the very heart of the European institutions". Criminal proceedings were brought against them and the legal machinery of the Spanish Supreme Court pulled out all the stops to have them extradited. The National Criminal Court of Spain issued its first European Arrest Warrant on 3 November.

In the meantime, Antoni Comín had already taken up residence in the historic university city of Leuven. The Belgian judge announced he would issue his ruling on the extradition on 14 December, although judge Llarena of the Spanish Supreme Court decided to withdraw the European Arrest Warrant when he realised that the Belgian Courts were unlikely to grant extradition. 

On 7 December, more than 100,000 Catalans flooded the streets of Brussels’ European Quarter in the demonstration organised by Òmnium and the ANC under the slogan “Wake up, Europe!”, a turnout that exceeded all expectations.

In the elections of 21 December, the Catalan pro-Independence movement maintained its majority in the Parliament of Catalonia and Toni Comín was elected as an MP in the ERC lists.

On 22 March 2018, judge Llarena of the Supreme Court issued the second European Arrest Warrant against the exiled members of the Catalan Government, which was also rejected by the Belgian judge one year later on 16 May 2018. The Belgian judge expressly rejected the extradition on account of a formal defect. Link "The European arrest warrant must be based on a national arrest warrant", ruled the CJEU in 2016.

On 12 July, the court of Schleswig-Holstein (Germany) rejected the extradition of Carles Puigdemont for rebellion and sedition. On the 19th of that same month, the Supreme Court decided to withdraw all the European Arrest Warrants against Antoni Comín and president Puigdemont, as well as those against Lluis Puig, Clara Ponsatí and Meritxell Serret.

European Parliament

The fight for the seat 

The elections to the European Parliament in 2019 heralded yet another tour de force with the Spanish Legal Authorities, who did their utmost to prevent the exiles, Carles Puigdemont, Antoni Comín and Oliveres and Clara Ponsatí, from becoming MEPs. First of all, the Junta Electoral Central [Electoral Commission] removed them from the "Lliures per Europa" [Free for Europe] coalition electoral list after the PP [People’s Party] and Ciutadans [Citizens] parties challenged their candidacy on the grounds of their legal circumstances.

An appeal was lodged with the Contentious Room of the Supreme Court, whose response argued that Puigdemont, Ponsatí and Comín were “entitled to stand” in the European elections.

Finally, on 26 May, in the European elections, the list of Junts i Lliures per Europa of president Puigdemont prevailed in Catalonia, obtaining almost one million votes, giving it 2 seats. Antoni Comín was second on the list and therefore became an MEP elect.

Following their election, the Electoral Commission refused to allow them to swear loyalty to the Spanish Constitution from Belgium, thus preventing them from taking up their seat at the beginning of their term of office. Both Carles Puigdemont and Toni Comín consequently lodged an appeal with the Court of Justice of the European Union which rejected outright the thesis of the Spanish Supreme Court on 19 September 2019. Therefore, six months after they had been elected, Antoni Comín i Oliveres and President Carles Puigdemont finally took possession of their seats in the European Parliament.

In the meantime, on 14 October, judge Llarena issued a third European Arrest warrant against Carles Puigdemont and Antoni Comín for the offences of rebellion and misappropriation of public funds, hours after the Supreme Court had announced its ruling sentencing the nine leaders of the procés to between 9 and 13 years of imprisonment. However, on 2 January 2020, the Belgian courts suspended the proceedings pertaining to the decision on whether or not they would be handed over to Spain after ascertaining that they enjoyed parliamentary immunity.

Parliament immunity 
On 16 January 2021, the European Parliament announced the initiation of the rogatory letter against Carles Puigdemont, Antoni Comín and Clara Ponsatí (who would become an MEP following Brexit) in order to revoke their immunity as MEPs and thus be able to reactivate the European Arrest Warrant.

Parliament activity 
In the European Parliament, Antoni Comín is a member of the Committees on Development and Humanitarian Assistance. He also sits on the Committee on the Environment, Public Health and Food Safety. 

During his term of office, Antoni Comín has been particularly active in calling for the lifting of the patents of the Covid-19 vaccines to accelerate the vaccination process in the countries of the South, as well as in matters related to the fight against climate change.

Council for the Republic 
Antoni Comín i Oliveres has been the vice-president and executive director of the Council for the Republic since it was presented in the Saló de Sant Jordi on 30 October 2018. The Council’s mission is to defend the mandate arising from the referendum of 1 October, according to which Catalonia must become an independent State in the form of a Republic. To this end, he has maintained its legitimacy and fought to bring this idea to fruition on a daily basis. The Council, based in Belgium, engages in disseminating the pro-Independence cause all over the world. It is regarded as the embryo of the institutions of the Catalan Republic, which was proclaimed in October 2017.

On 29 February 2020, the Council staged a mass event in the Exhibition Park in Perpignan, with a turnout of more than 150,000 people, the most important political concentration ever organised in France.

Collaboration with the media 
Throughout his professional career, Antoni Comín has collaborated regularly with the mass media, particularly the printed press and the radio, through articles, talks and different collaborations in the course of which he has shared his insights and his view of current affairs over the last decades in Catalonia, Spain, Europe and the world.

In 1993, he joined the Editorial Board of the El Ciervo Journal – one of whose founders was his father, Alfonso Comín – where he worked and published articles regularly for more than 20 years until 2015.

He was also a regular contributor to the La República weekly, publishing articles in it between 2018 and 2020. Before that, he had also published regularly for several years, first in El Mundo – Catalonia and subsequently in the ARA daily. In the course of his professional career, he has published articles in many other printed media, including dailies, magazines and journals, such as El País, El Periódico, El Punt Avui, Iglesia Viva or Quaderns de Cristianisme i Justícia, to name but some.

He has also enjoyed a constant presence in the different audiovisual media in Catalonia. His first collaboration was with the “Postres de Music” programme on Catalunya Ràdio in 1998, and he went on to feature regularly on other political talk-shows on the same station, as well as other programmes on Barcelona Televisió, COM Ràdio and the night-time talk-show on RAC-1. He was also a guest on the leading morning radio talk show in Catalonia, El perquè de tot plegat on RAC1, for five years.

Works 

 El sentido político de la marginación (Sal Terrae, 1996)
 "Emmanuel Mounier" (10 pensadors cristians del segle XX, 1997)
 Els canvis són possibles (1998)
 La igualtat, una fita pendent. Cristianisme i Justícia. (1999)
 La mundialización: aspectos políticos, a ¿Mundialización o conquista? (1999)
 La unidad perdida del ser y el pensar (2000)
 Emmanuel Mounier, el seu impacte en el pensament polític (Diálegs, 2001)
 "Política e interioridad" (a La interioridad, un paradigma emergente, 2002)
 Los cambios son posibles (2002)
 Globalizar la política para democratizar la economía, a Mundo global, justicia parcial (2003)
 Autoritat mundial. Per a un lideratge planetari legítim. Cristianisme i Justícia. (2005)
 Federalismo de la diversidad, en nombre de la igualdad (a Hacia una España plural, social y federal, 2005)
 Cuando llueve, sin duda hace falta un paraguas (a Sobre el presente y el futuro del sindicalismo, 2006)
 A fronte del dogmatismo, un elogio della critica, non del relativismo (2006)
 Governabilitat democràtica global: Proposta d'organització institucional (2007)
 "Europa dividida" (a Món dividit, 2007)
 Les paraules del socialisme (2008)
 Democràcia Econòmica. Cap a una alternativa al capitalisme (2009)
 "Notas (intempestivas) sobre el liberalismo" (a Liberalismo vs Socialdemocracia, 2010)

References

External links 
 
 Toni Comín's blog
 Antoni Comín and Oliveres on Twitter
 Members of the Parliament of Catalonia during the VIII Legislature p. 83

1971 births
Autonomous University of Barcelona alumni
Academic staff of ESADE
Health ministers of Catalonia
Living people
People from Barcelona
LGBT legislators in Spain
Exiled politicians from Catalonia
Members of the 11th Parliament of Catalonia
Fugitives wanted by Spain
Members of the 12th Parliament of Catalonia
MEPs for Spain 2019–2024
People barred from public office
Together for Catalonia (2020) politicians
21st-century Spanish LGBT people